Fydell Edmund Garrett (1865–1907), also known as Edmund Garrett, was a British publicist, journalist and poet. He was returned as a Member of the Parliament of the Cape of Good Hope in 1898 for Victoria East constituency.

Biography
Garrett was born on 20 July 1865, was fourth son of John Fisher Garrett, rector of Elton, Derbyshire, and his wife, Mary, daughter of Godfrey Gray. He was educated at Rossall School and Trinity College, Cambridge, where he graduated B.A. in the summer term of 1887 with a third class in Classics. At the university he was more distinguished at the Cambridge Union, of which he was president in 1887, than in the schools. But though not taking a high degree, he gave in other ways early evidence of exceptional literary ability. Some of his translations from the classical poets, as well as his original pieces, contained in a small volume of undergraduate verse, Rhymes and Renderings, published at Cambridge in 1887, are remarkable not only for their grace and ease of expression but for a real poetic feeling.

On leaving the university Garrett joined the staff of the Pall Mall Gazette, and rapidly made his mark as a journalist by the force of his convictions — he was at this time a radical — the freshness of his style, and a happy gift of humour. But he had always been delicate, and after two years of work in London his health broke down. The first symptoms of tuberculosis became apparent, and he was sent for cure to South Africa. This led to a temporary remission, and his visit to South Africa in the winter of 1889-90 led to other consequences most important to his career.

South Africa was at that time entering the critical period of her history which terminated in the war of 1899-1902. Garrett, an young man of exceptional intelligence, not lacking in audacity, and of most winning manners and appearance, was quick to seize the salient points in an interesting situation and to make the acquaintance of the leading actors in the drama. He won the confidence of Sir Hercules Robinson, then high commissioner for South Africa, and made great friends with Cecil Rhodes, besides establishing more or less intimate relations with the leading politicians of Dutch and German origins respectively, Jan Hofmeyr and President Paul Kruger. The result was a series of articles in the Pall Mall Gazette, subsequently published as a book, In Afrikanderland and the Land of Ophir (1891, 2 edits.), which in 1912 was still the best description of South Africa in that momentous phase of its development.

The next four years were again devoted, as far as recurrent attacks of ill-health permitted, to journalistic work in London, first for the Pall Mall Gazette, then, from 1893, for the Westminster Gazette, in the opening years of its career, in either case under the editorship of Garrett's friend, (Sir) Edward Cook. In 1894 he also produced a translation of Henrik Ibsen's Brand into English verse in the original metres, which, if not perfect as a translation, for Garrett was not a great Norwegian scholar, is singularly successful in reproducing the spirit and poetry of the original.

In April 1895 Garrett returned to South Africa to become editor of the Cape Times, the leading English newspaper in the sub-continent, and far the most important work of Garrett's life was done during his four and a half years' active tenure of that office (April 1895 – August 1899). He was not only editor of the paper but the principal writer in it, and being a man of strong character and convictions, gifted moreover with extraordinary quickness of political insight, he on more than one occasion exercised by his trenchant pen a decisive influence on the course of affairs. In the rapid series of stirring events of these four years, the raid, the abortive rebellion in Johannesburg, the struggle between Rhodes and the Bond at the Cape, and between Kruger and the Uitlanders in the Transvaal, the Bloemfontein conference, and the growing tension between Great Britain and the South African Republic (the government of the Transvaal), Garrett played a leading part.

His position in South African politics became one of such importance that he was practically compelled to add to his arduous duties as editor of the Cape Times those of a member of parliament. Returned at the Cape general election of 1898 as member for Victoria East, he immediately took a foremost place in the Cape Legislative Assembly, and in the two heated sessions preceding the war he was perhaps the most eloquent, and he was certainly the most persuasive, speaker on the "progressive" (i.e. British) side, for, while warmly supporting Rhodes and the policy of Lord (then Sir Alfred) Alfred Milner, he showed great tact in dealing with the susceptibilities of his Afrikaner opponents. Indeed, the policy which he always advocated, that of a United South Africa, absolutely autonomous in its own affairs, but remaining part of the British Empire, is now an established fact, readily accepted by men of all parties. Garrett's important contribution to that result constitutes his chief title to remembrance. But the enormous physical strain was too much for his frail constitution. In the summer of 1899 his health broke down permanently.

Obliged to leave South Africa, in an advanced stage of tuberculosis, just before the outbreak of the Second Boer War, he spent the next two or three years in sanatoria, first on the European continent and then in England, still hoping against hope that he might be able to return to an active political career. He had already in January 1900 resigned the editorship of the Cape Times, and in 1902 he also gave up his seat in the house of assembly. He still from time to time, when his health permitted the exertion, wrote short articles and poems of exceptional merit, which are of permanent value.

In March 1903 Garrett married Ellen Marriage; they had met as a fellow patients at the East Anglian Sanatorium in Wiston, Essex. Miss Marriage had fully recovered from her neurasthenia, and it was thanks to her care and devotion that Garrett's life was prolonged for another four years — years of great happiness, despite his complete physical prostration.

In June 1904 the Garretts moved to a cottage, Wiverton Acre, near Plympton, Devon. Garrett died there on 10 May 1907, and was buried in the churchyard at Brixton, Devon. To the last he occasionally wrote, chiefly on South Africa. Within a month of his death he contributed to the Standard (12 April) an article on "The Boer in the Saddle", which showed no loss of his old brilliancy and force, although the effort involved in writing it was nearly fatal.

Criticism of theosophy
From 29 October to 8 November 1894 The Westminster Gazette published a series of articles by Garrett entitled Isis Very Much Unveiled, Being the Story of the Great Mahatma Hoax. They were collected into a booklet which caused much controversy. Garrett exposed the fraud of the Mahatma Letters and quarrels in the Theosophical Society after the death of Helena Blavatsky. For the expose, Garrett had received Theosophical documents from Walter Gorn Old.

Works
Garrett wrote short articles and poems of exceptional merit, which are of permanent value. notably his brilliant Character Sketch of Cecil Rhodes, published directly after Rhodes's death in the Contemporary Review of June 1902, which is by far the most lifelike and best balanced picture of that great personality that had been written by 1912. Of much interest likewise are some of his memorial verses:
The Last Trek, written on the occasion of President Kruger's funeral progress from Cape Town to Pretoria (Spectator, 10 December 1904)
 
In Memoriam F. W. R. (Frank Rhodes), (Westminster Gazette, 27 October 1905)
A Millionaire's Epitaph (Alfred Beit), (Westminster Gazette, 20 July 1906)

Garrett wrote an epitaph inspired by the famous epitaph of Simonides at Thermopylae:

A similar epithet is to be found engraved on all the obelisks which at Elandslaagte and on many another battlefield surmount the graves of officers and troopers in the Imperial Light Horse who fell during the Second Boer War (1899–1902). 

In the immediate decades after the Boer War it was well known, and some First World War memorials, such as the Southport War Memorial carry similar epitaphs. Garrett was very pleased when his longer epitaph, for Boers and Britons buried side by side, was quoted by G. P. Wessels in a reconciliation speech.  Besides the works already mentioned Garrett published:
 The Story of an African Crisis (1897)
 Isis Very Much Unveiled: Being the Story of the Great Mahatma Hoax (1894)
 A chapter, "Rhodes and Milner", to The Empire and the Century (1905)

The Garrett Colonial Library, which was founded by colonial admirers in his memory, was opened at the Cambridge Union Society on 23 May 1911. A pencil portrait by Sir Edward Poynter was in 1912 in the possession of his widow.

Notes

References

Attribution
 Endnotes
An excellent Life by Sir Edward Cook (1909) contains many extracts from his letters, a good photographic portrait, and, in the Appendix, some of his best fugitive pieces in prose and verse.

Further reading 

 
 
 

1865 births
1907 deaths
Critics of Theosophy
British sceptics
South African newspaper editors
Members of the House of Assembly of the Cape Colony